The VIII Army Corps / VIII AK was a corps level command of the Prussian and then the Imperial German Armies from the 19th Century to World War I.

Originating on 21 June 1815 as the General Command for the Grand Duchy of the Lower Rhine and established on 3 April 1820 as VIII Corps.  The headquarters was in Koblenz and its catchment area was the Rhine Province and the Principality of Birkenfeld of the Grand Duchy of Oldenburg.

The Corps served in the Austro-Prussian War.  During the Franco-Prussian War it was assigned to the 1st Army.

In peacetime the Corps was assigned to the V Army Inspectorate but joined the 4th Army at the start of the First World War.  It was still in existence at the end of the war.  The Corps was disbanded with the demobilisation of the German Army after World War I.

Austro-Prussian War 
VIII Corps fought in the Austro-Prussian War in 1866, seeing action in the Battle of Königgrätz.

Franco-Prussian War 
During the Franco-Prussian War, the Corps formed part of the 1st Army.  Initially involved in the battles around Metz (Battle of Gravelotte) and subsequent siege of the fortress.  After the capitulation of Metz in October 1870 it took part in the fighting north of Paris in the Battle of Hallue and the siege of the fortress of Péronne.  Subsequent battles followed at Amiens and finally at St. Quentin.

Peacetime organisation 
The 25 peacetime Corps of the German Army (Guards, I - XXI, I - III Bavarian) had a reasonably standardised organisation.  Each consisted of two divisions with usually two infantry brigades, one field artillery brigade and a cavalry brigade each.  Each brigade normally consisted of two regiments of the appropriate type, so each Corps normally commanded 8 infantry, 4 field artillery and 4 cavalry regiments.  There were exceptions to this rule:
V, VI, VII, IX and XIV Corps each had a 5th infantry brigade (so 10 infantry regiments)
II, XIII, XVIII and XXI Corps had a 9th infantry regiment
I, VI and XVI Corps had a 3rd cavalry brigade (so 6 cavalry regiments)
the Guards Corps had 11 infantry regiments (in 5 brigades) and 8 cavalry regiments (in 4 brigades).
Each Corps also directly controlled a number of other units.  This could include one or more
Foot Artillery Regiment
Jäger Battalion
Pioneer Battalion
Train Battalion

World War I

Organisation on mobilisation 
On mobilization on 2 August 1914 the Corps was restructured.  16th Cavalry Brigade was withdrawn to form part of the 3rd Cavalry Division and the 15th Cavalry Brigade was broken up and its regiments assigned to the divisions as reconnaissance units.  Divisions received engineer companies and other support units from the Corps headquarters.  In summary, VIII Corps mobilised with 24 infantry battalions, 8 machine gun companies (48 machine guns), 8 cavalry squadrons, 24 field artillery batteries (144 guns), 4 heavy artillery batteries (16 guns), 3 pioneer companies and an aviation detachment.

Combat chronicle 
On mobilisation, VIII Corps was assigned to the 4th Army forming part of the centre of the forces for the Schlieffen Plan offensive in August 1914.  It was still in existence at the end of the war.

Commanders 
The VIII Corps had the following commanders during its existence:

See also 

Franco-Prussian War order of battle
German Army order of battle (1914)
List of Imperial German infantry regiments
List of Imperial German artillery regiments
List of Imperial German cavalry regiments

References

Bibliography 
 
 
 
 
 

Corps of Germany in World War I
Military units and formations established in 1815
Military units and formations disestablished in 1919